Third-seeded Margaret Osborne duPont defeated Louise Brough 4–6, 6–4, 15–13 in the final to win the women's singles tennis title at the 1948 U.S. National Championships.

Seeds
The seven seeded U.S. players are listed below. Margaret Osborne duPont is the champion; others show in brackets the round in which they were eliminated.

  Louise Brough (finalist)
  Doris Hart (quarterfinals)
  Margaret Osborne duPont (champion)
  Pat Canning Todd (semifinals)
  Shirley Fry (third round)
  Beverly Baker (quarterfinals)
  Gussy Moran (semifinals)

Draw

Key
 Q = Qualifier
 WC = Wild card
 LL = Lucky loser
 r = Retired

Final eight

References

1948
1948 in women's tennis
1948 in American women's sports
Women's Singles